Braywoodside is a hamlet in Berkshire, England.

Hamlets in Berkshire
Bray, Berkshire